"Cupid" is the third and final single released from 112's debut album of the same name. Slim sings lead on the song. The song peaked at number 13 on the Billboard Hot 100 and number 2 on the Hot R&B/Hip-Hop Songs chart, their third top 40 hit on both charts. It was certified Platinum by the RIAA for selling 1,000,000 copies.

Music video 
Directed by Dante Ariola and Jay Papke, the video features the band singing their affections towards a woman while standing or sitting on a chair.

Formats and track listing 
 Europe CD maxi-single
 1. "Cupid" – 4:12
 2. "Cry On" – 5:26
 3. "I Can't Believe" (featuring Faith Evans) – 5:32
 4. "Cupid" (Instrumental) – 4:12
 US 7"
 1. "Cupid" (Radio Mix) – 4:12
 2. "Only You" – 4:21
 US 12"
 A1. "Cupid" – 4:13
 A2. "Cry On" – 5:26
 A3. "I Can't Believe" (featuring Faith Evans) – 5:32
 B1. "Cupid" (Instrumental) – 4:12
 B2. "I Can't Believe" (Instrumental) – 5:32
 US 12" (Promo)
 A. "Cupid" (Radio Mix) – 4:12
 B. "Cupid" (Instrumental) – 4:12
 US CD single
 1. "Cupid" – 4:12
 2. "Cry On" – 5:26
 3. "I Can't Believe" – 5:32
 4. "Cupid" (Instrumental) – 4:12
 5. "I Can't Believe" (Instrumental) – 5:32
 US CD single (Cardboard Sleeve)
 1. "Cupid" (Radio Mix) – 4:12
 2. "This Is Your Day" – 4:47
 US CD single (Promo)
 1. "Cupid" (Radio Mix) – 4:12

Charts and certifications

Weekly charts

Year-end charts

Certifications

|}

References 

1995 songs
1997 singles
1990s ballads
112 (band) songs
Bad Boy Records singles
Contemporary R&B ballads
Songs written by Daron Jones
Songs written by Quinnes Parker
Songs written by Slim (singer)
Cupid in music